Tulsa Pittaway (born Tulsa Theodore Pittaway; 9 December 1974 – 21 May 2017) was a South African musician. He was best known as the drummer for the South African Music Award-winning indie rock band Watershed as well as Evolver One and Brothering. He was also known for his solo works.

References

External links
Bergbron accident claims life of well known SA drummer
South Africans Pay Tribute to Former Watershed Drummer Tulsa Pittaway
Evolver One evolve with fourth studio album
 Official website
 

1974 births
2017 deaths
South African musicians
South African drummers